Brendan Guhle (born July 29, 1997) is a Canadian former professional ice hockey defenceman. Guhle was selected by the Buffalo Sabres in the second round, 51st overall, of the 2015 NHL Entry Draft.

Playing career

Junior
In the 2012 Western Hockey League Bantam Draft, Guhle was drafted with the third-overall pick by the Prince Albert Raiders.

In January 2014, Guhle was a member of Canada's silver medal-winning Team Pacific at the World U-17 Hockey Challenge.

In January 2015, Guhle participated in the BMO CHL/NHL Top Prospects Game, a showcase of the Canadian Hockey League's top draft eligible players for the 2015 NHL Draft. In 2015, he was a member of Team Canada's WHL team in the CHL Canada-Russia series.

Guhle was drafted in the second round, 51st overall, by the Buffalo Sabres in the 2015 NHL Entry Draft. On July 27, 2015, the Sabres signed Guhle to a 3-year entry-level contract.

Guhle played four games with the Sabres during the 2015 preseason, recording two assists. The team chose to return him to Prince Albert for the 2015–16 season. When Prince Albert's season ended, Guhle was recalled to the Rochester Americans of the American Hockey League.

During the 2016–17 season, the Raiders traded Guhle to the Prince George Cougars.

Professional

Buffalo Sabres
On December 2, 2016, Guhle was called up by the Sabres on an emergency basis. Guhle played three games for the Sabres while the team's defensemen were injured; while Guhle impressed the Sabres organization during his time in Buffalo, the clause in the NHL Collective Bargaining Agreement allowing for his emergency call-up also forced the team to return him to Prince George when one of their defensemen returned to health.

Guhle began the 2017–18 season with the Rochester Americans and received a call-up to the Sabres on January 8, 2018. He featured in 18 games with the Sabres, posting 5 assists, before completing the season with the Americans, registering 26 points in 50 games.

In the following 2018–19 season, Guhle continued with Rochester, earning a recall to the Sabres on December 16, 2018, making two scoreless appearances before returning to the Americans. He was selected to the AHL All-Star Classic and participated in the 2019 AHL Skills Competition where he posted the sixth-fastest time in the fastest skater competition in event history. Guhle ranked second among Rochester defensemen with 27 points in 50 games.

Anaheim Ducks
On February 24, 2019, Guhle was traded by the Sabres, along with a 2019 first-round pick to the Anaheim Ducks in exchange for Brandon Montour. During the pause of the 2019–20 season, on May 10, 2020, Guhle was signed a two-year, $1.6 million contract extension with the Ducks.

Eisbären Berlin

With his NHL prospects having stagnated within the Ducks organization, as an impending restricted free agent Guhle opted to sign his first contract abroad in agreeing to a one-year deal with German club, Eisbären Berlin of the DEL, on July 5, 2022.

On December 20, 2022, Guhle retired from hockey due to personal reasons.

Personal life
Guhle grew up in Sherwood Park, Alberta and is a graduate of Archbishop Jordan High School. His younger brother Kaiden, also a hockey player, was drafted sixteenth overall in the 2020 NHL Entry Draft by the Montreal Canadiens.

Career statistics

Regular season and playoffs

International

Awards and honours

References

External links

1997 births
Living people
Anaheim Ducks players
Buffalo Sabres draft picks
Buffalo Sabres players
Canadian ice hockey defencemen
Eisbären Berlin players
Prince Albert Raiders players
Prince George Cougars players
Rochester Americans players
San Diego Gulls (AHL) players
Ice hockey people from Edmonton
Sportspeople from Sherwood Park